Sir Edward de Warren was an illegitimate son of John de Warenne, 7th Earl of Surrey by his mistress Maud de Nerford of Norfolk.  He was lord of the manor of Skeyton and also held other lands in Norfolk. His son Sir John de Warren ( - 25 November 1386) was the first of this surname to succeed to the manors of Stockport and Poynton in Cheshire, and Woodplumpton in Lancashire.

Family and early life
In 1306, Edward's father John de Warenne was married to Joan of Bar, a granddaughter of King Edward I of England. But the marriage was not a success. In 1309 King Edward II of England granted leave for John to make anyone he wanted heir to the lands that he held. But he wanted surety that any heir that he may have by his wife Joan would not to be disinherited. The earl was living openly with Maud by 1311.

Edward's mother Maud de Nerford was a daughter of Sir William de Nerford of Narford, via his wife Petronilla, a daughter of Sir John de Vaux. On 8 March 1315 in a notice read out to Joan of Bar, Countess of Surrey for a petition of the divorce of Joan and the earl, she was described as "Maud of Neyrford, daughter of the former William of Neyrford Knight, deceased, of the diocese of Norwich."  Her father William had died in 1302, and Petronilla his wife was William's heir. Among Maud's siblings were John and Thomas de Nerford who were later Knighted and also Edmund. In 1315 John de Warenne granted his manor of Saddlescombe in Sussex to Thomas de Nerford for life. In 1316 the earl granted to Edmund de Nerford the reversion of a messuage, two carucates of land, twenty four acres of meadow and ten marks of rent in Harrowby, Donisthorpe, Grantham, and Barkston. Sir John and Thomas de Nerford witnessed a charter with John de Warenne in 1317.

Edward was not named in a land settlement dated 4 August 1316, and the earl's two sons, John and Thomas by Maud de Nerford were. Because of this it is probable that Edward was born after this date but before 1320, at which point the earl had "expelled Maud de Nerforde from his heart and his company."  Maud de Nerford had died by 22 November 1345. By this date her sons John and Thomas had joined the order of the Knights Hospitallers of St John of Jerusalem at Clerkenwell Priory. They were not named in their father's will on 24 June 1347.

Between 1323 and 1324 Sir Ralf de Skeyton settled "Boton" (Booton, Norfolk) and Skeyton on himself for life. Oliver de Redham and Richard de Drenkeston or Drencheston acted as trustees. If Ralph died without heirs, the manors of Skeyton, and Booton, with appertunances and adowson of the churches were to go to Matilda (Maud) de Nerford. And if Maud died "without heirs of her body so procreated"  they were to go first to her son Ralph. If Ralph died with no heirs they were to go to Maud's other son Edward. In 1326 Maud de Nerford retained a messuage, land, and the fourth part of a messuage in Cawston, Booton, Brandiston, and Skeyton acquired from Richard de Drencheston and Oliver de Redham.

In 1334, Edward's brother Ralph was named "Ravlyn son of the Earl of Warenne" in a parliamentary petition by Ralph le Botiller (Butler). On 20 November 1338, John de Warren, Earl of Surrey had a licence to "grant a sixth part of the barony of Wich-Malbank to John de Gaydon and William de Blorton, in trust to grant the same to John Mautravers and Joan his wife, for life, with remainder to Ralph de Warrenne, and Joan his wife, and the heirs of their bodies, and, them failing, to the right heirs of the said Joan, wife of the aforesaid John Mautravers." Ralph and his wife Joan obtained the sixth part of the barony.

Ralph de Warren died without issue, sometime prior to 1342, when his widow Joan, a daughter of Nicholas Percy, had become the wife of Peter de Brewes. He was not named in the will of his father written on 24 June 1347. On 20 October 1349, Peter de Brewes was recorded as lord of the manor of Skeyton, and Ralph's then recently deceased brother Edward had been lord of that manor prior to his death. Joan, Ralph's widow was divorced from Peter between 27 January 1352 and 24 October 1352, and then married to Alan Cheney before 1353. She died on 15 August 1370. Alan Cheney died 28 June 1384. After Alan Cheney's death, the sixth part of the barony of Wich-Malbank in Cheshire descended to Alice, wife of John Browning as "daughter and heir of Joan, wife of John Mautravers, and sister and heir of Joan wife of Alan." Alice, wife of John Browning and her sister Joan (who firstly married Ralph de Warren) were actually half-sisters: Their mother was born Joan Foliot, who first married Nicholas Percy and by him had Joan who was born in 1321. Nicholas Percy died on 6 August 1324. Joan the widow of Nicholas Percy, then married John Mautravers, and their daughter Alice was born 29 September 1325. Alice later married John Browning. John Mautravers died, and his widow Joan (born Foliot), then married Alexander Venables. Joan Venables died in 1347. In that year two Cheshire inquisition post mortems were taken: One indicated that Joan, aged 26 years, a daughter of Nicholas Percy and then currently wife of Peter de Brewes was the next heir of Joan Venables. The other inquisition stated the same but also detailed that Alice, daughter of John Mautravers was also heir to Joan Venables, and Alice and Joan were sisters.

Marriage

He married Cicely, a daughter of Nicholas de Eton  via his wife Joan, a daughter of Richard de Stokeport, lord of Stockport.

His lands in Norfolk

In 1346, Felicia the widow of Ralph de Skeyton was recorded as holding Booton. Felicia held this of the heirs of Thomas de Nerford. Edward de Warren was recorded as holding lands in "Skegton" (Skeyton) in that year. Both places were within the hundred of South Erpingham in Norfolk. He also held lands in Norfolk or was joint mesne lord of lands and tenements in "Crostweyt" (Crostwick), Berton and Tibenham, and Rougham and Fransham outside of the hundred of South Erpingham. Edward held two parts of a fee of lands in Skeyton in the hundred of South Erpingham, and Crostwick, Berton and Tibenham outside of this hundred of the heirs of Fulk Baniard which had formerly been held by John de "Skegton" (Skeyton).With William Whitwell, Edward was a joint mesne lord of lands and tenements in Crostwick and Berton in the hundred of Tunstede.

Discharged from finding a man-at-arms
On 22 April 1346, Edward was named as the son of John Earl Warenne of Surrey and Stratherne, was ready to serve the King abroad. Warrenne's son William was also ready to serve the king. But the earl asked the Chancellor to discharge Edward from finding a man-at-arms for his lands in Norfolk. Edward is recorded in the rolls of Crécy and Calais in the retinue of William de Warrenne, his brother or half-brother.

Left a legacy in his father's will

His father's will was written on 24 June 1347 at Conisbrough Castle. Edward was left twenty pounds in this will. He had not yet been Knighted at this date.

The adowson of Itteringham (1348-1349)

In 1348 he was named as "Sir Edward de Warren, Knight" and held a portion named "Bintre's Portion" of the adowson of Itteringham.

In 1349 Edward was involved in a trial which concerned who held the adowson of Itteringham, and therefore had the right to present a rector there. The trial was between Sir Edward, and Maud, the widow of John de Dallying. It was found that agreements were made by deeds, that they should present alternatively.

Death
Edward was dead by 20 October 1349. On this date a commission of oyer and terminer was instituted on complaint by Peter de Brewes. In relation to Skeyton at this time, he was referred to as "Edward de Garrenne, late lord of that manor" and Cicely his widow was still alive. Peter de Brewes was lord of the manor of Skeyton at this time, and a rent of 10 Marks was due to him which had been accumulated by Edward. Two of Peter's servants took cattle from "Cicely, late the wife of the said Edward" for half of the rent in arrears. But the cattle were rescued, and the servants who took this cattle were assaulted.

His son Sir John de Warren ( - 25 November 1386)

Edward's son John de Warren by his wife Cicely, was around the age of 26 years in 1369. On 8 March 1370 at Erpingham in Norfolk, Sir Robert de Erpingham and his son Sir John  signed their names to a charter, along with Sir Robert de Salle and Sir John de Colby, all testifying that John de Warren was the next heir of Isabel, daughter of Sir Richard de Stokeport (or de Eton: Sir Richard's grandmother was Joan de Stokeport. She was the eldest daughter and sole heiress of the Lord of Stockport. Sir Richard's grandfather was Nicholas de Eton.Sir Richard's father, Robert de Eton brother of Cicely, and uncle of John de Warren, succeeded to the manor of Stockport and was commonly known as Robert de Stokeport.) and Isabel had died in 1369. Sir Robert de Erpingham, and his son Sir John were grandfather and father respectively of Sir Thomas Erpingham. They testified that John was the son of Sir Edward de Warren and his mother was Cicely, a daughter of Nicholas de Eton, and John de Warren was heir to Isabel because they both shared a common ancestor in Nicholas. Isabel's inquisition post mortem was taken in March 1370 at Chester. She was John's cousin once removed. His paternity, maternity, estimated age, and relationship to Isabel are detailed in that inquisition:

"...she died in the feast of St.Luke the Evangelist (October 18th), 43 Edward III (1369), and John, the son of Sir Edward Warren, Knt., is next of kin and next heir, namely son of a certain Cicely, sister of Robert de Stokeport, father of the said Sir Richard de Stokeport, Knt., father of the said Isabella, and the said John is of the age of 26 years and more."  From this, John de Warren succeeded to the manor of Bredbury, and also lands in Romiley, Werneth, and Etchells.

In the same year as Isabel's inquisition, John de Warren held "Bintre's Portion" of the adowson of Itteringham in Norfolk. His father Edward held this same portion of that adowson in 1348.

He married Margaret, daughter of Sir John de Stafford in 1371. John had been Knighted by 1379, and held the adowson of Skeyton that year presenting Roger de Schevesby as rector.

Sir John later succeeded to the manors of Stockport, Poynton, and Woodplumpton as did his heirs.  On 19 March 1386, he witnessed a charter with Sir Thomas Erpingham, at Brandiston, just under two miles from Booton, Norfolk.

He died on 25 November 1386 and was buried at Booton. His widow Margaret married John Mainwaring of Over Peover, who was recorded as holding Booton  and Skeyton in 1401. John Mainwaring was dead by 1410.

Sir John de Warren and Margaret had a son named Nicholas de Warren who married Agnes, a daughter of Sir Richard Winnington. Nicholas predeceased his mother Margaret who died in 1418, and had a son Lawrence de Warren, named as heir to his grandmother Margaret in her inquisition, and listed as 24 years and above. One of the witnesses to this inquisition post mortem in 1418 was John de Whitwell of Felmingham, which is very close to Skeyton in Norfolk.

References

Notes

1349 deaths